Elikplim Yao Atiemo (born in Accra, Ghana), better known by his stage name Shaker (Lil Shaker), is a Ghanaian recording artist, songwriter, producer and performer. He is currently signed to Ghana's biggest record label and multimedia company, BBnZ Live which also have artist like EL. He has hits like ‘I No Dey See U Saf’ and ‘Madakraa’ and also produced Sarkodie ‘Talk Of Gh’ and ‘Lies’.

Early life
Elikplim Yao Atiemo was born in Accra , the capital of Ghana to Ghanaian parents and natives of the Volta Region. He started his musical career at age 15. He is currently signed to Ghana's biggest record label and multimedia company, BBnZ Live.

Music career

Collaborations and influences
Shaker, has collaborated with artistes such as Sarkodie, EL, Raquel, Wanlov the Kubolor, Edem, Gemini and many others.

Discography

Studio albums 
Burning Schedule
Captain Hook
Shaker

Major singles

 I no dey see u Sef featuring Sarkodie, Joey B, Raquel, Edem & Kevin Beats Produced by Magnom Konkonsa featuring Stargo Produced by B2
 Pray featuring EL Produced by E.L
 Hello featuring EL and DJ Mic Smith Produced by E.L
 Fi featuring EL and Raquel Produced by MagNom
 Krochia featuring Medikal  Produced by Essencebeats Superstar featuring EL  Produced by Peeweezel Falaa featuring EL  Produced by B2 Kontihene featuring Sakoaba  Produced by Kuvie Licki LickiProduced by Shaker All My Money featuring Edem  Produced by Gee Mix Two Thoozing featuring Edem & Gemini Produced by '''Shaker
 Pepper  featuring Sarkodie Produced by Shaker
  Me P3 Kwan featuring Sarkodie Produced by NshonaMuzick
  KpoliKpo + So E Dey Produced by B2
  Bring Your Body ft Joey B Produced by B2
  My Friend ft Wanlov, Gemini, & E.L Produced by B2
  Handkerchief ft KO-JO Cue Produced by Magnom
  Edawoso Produced by MOG Beatz''

Record
In October 2015, Shaker joined Ko-Jo Cue, Cwesi Oteng and E.L at BBNZ Live.

References

Living people
Ghanaian musicians
People from Volta Region
Year of birth missing (living people)